Yzerfontein, or Ysterfontein, is a small harbour town with about 1200 inhabitants on the west coast of South Africa about 90 km north of Cape Town. The name in Afrikaans means "Iron Fountain".The town started out when the farm 'Yzerfontein' was bought by the Katz-family in the 1930s. Then they started dividing the farm into plots. The main sources of income are tourism (especially during the wildflower season from August to October), mining and fishing.

Yzerfontein is known for its Sixteen Mile Beach, stretching north from the main beach of the town, to the West Coast National Park, which borders the town.  Dassen Island, another nature reserve, is about 10 km offshore.

Yzerfontein is the landing point for the ACE and WACS submarine communications cables.

Outside of the town is the Darling Wind Farm. This is producing power and there are plans for expansion.

The Yzerfontein salt pan is a  coastal salt pan, just northeast of the town. It was formerly mined for salt, and is currently mined for gypsum.

These days Yzerfontein is more modern. It has a new spa, coffee shop, pharmacy and many restaurants. Its harbour is busy when it is kreef season or snoek season.

References

External links
Information site for Yzerfontein

Populated places in the Swartland Local Municipality
Populated places established in 1937